Dušan Tóth (born 8 February 1971) is a former Slovak football midfielder who played for Dukla Banská Bystrica, 1. FC Košice and five-times for Slovakia. He is currently a football coach, and was most recently in charge of Dukla Banská Bystrica.

References

External links

1971 births
Living people
Slovak footballers
Slovakia international footballers
FC VSS Košice players
Slovak Super Liga players
FK Dukla Banská Bystrica players
Association football midfielders